Kalenjin names (sing. kainet, pl. old Kalenjin - kainok pl. modern Kalenjin - kainaik) are primarily used by the Kalenjin people of Kenya and Kalenjin language-speaking communities such as Murle in Ethiopia, Sebei of Uganda, Datooga, Akie and Aramanik of Tanzania.

The Kalenjin traditionally had two primary names for the individual though in contemporary times a Christian or Arabic name is also given at birth such that most Kalenjin today have three names with the patronym Arap in some cases being acquired later in life e.g Alfred Kirwa Yego and Daniel Toroitch arap Moi.

Given name
An individual is given a personal name at birth and this is determined by the circumstance of their birth. For most Kalenjin speaking communities, masculine names are often prefixed with Kip- or Ki- though there are exceptions to the rule e.g Cheruiyot, Chepkwony, Chelanga etc. Feminine names in turn are often prefixed with Chep- or Che- though among the Tugen and Keiyo, the prefix Kip- may in some cases denote both males and females. The personal name would thus be derived through adding the relevant prefix to the description of the circumstance of birth, for example a child born in the evening (lagat) might be called Kiplagat or Chelagat.

Popular given names

Some examples of popular Kalenjin names and their meanings;

Last name
The tradition of giving a family surname to an individual dates to the colonial period and in most cases the surnames in use today were the second names of the family patriarch of two to four generations ago. Traditionally an individual acquired their father's name after their initiation. Females took on their father's name e.g Cheptoo Lagat being the daughter of Lagat and Cheptoo Kiplagat being the daughter of Kiplgat while males took on just the descriptor portion of the father's name such that the Kiprono son of Kiplagat would become Kiprono arap Lagat.

Arap (patronym)
Arap is patronym meaning son of. It was traditionally given following the labetab eun (kelab eun)  ceremony and all initiates would after the ceremony acquire their father's name e.g Toroitich son of Kimoi and Kipkirui son of Kiprotich would after the ceremony be Toroitich arap Moi and Kipkirui arap Rotich. In modern times it is confined to progressing age-sets independent of the individual initiation ceremony such that if the current age-set is Nyongi, all individuals of preceding age-sets may use the term Arap.

Nicknames

Praise names
In the past, praise names were sometimes acquired through various acts of courage or community service. A previously common example of the former was Barng'etuny (one who killed a lion).

References

See also
 Kalenjin Naming System

Names
 
Names by culture